is a railway station on the Hakodate Main Line in Bibai, Hokkaidō, Japan, operated by the Hokkaido Railway Company (JR Hokkaido).

Lines
Chashinai Station is served by the Hakodate Main Line. It is numbered A17.

Adjacent stations

History
Chashinai Station opened on 15 July 1916.

References

Railway stations in Hokkaido Prefecture
Railway stations in Japan opened in 1916